Edward Frederick Leitner, also Friedrich August Ludwig Leitner (4 February 1812, in Stuttgart – 15 January 1838) was a German botanist, naturalist and physician.

At the age of four, his family moved to Schorndorf after the death of his father. Following studies of botany at the University of Tübingen, he moved to the United States after receiving a subsidy from the Society of Natural Sciences in Württemberg. In 1831 he began taking classes at the Medical College of South Carolina in Charleston. In 1833 collected botanical and zoological specimens in Florida, eventually reaching the Florida Keys, during which, he paid a visit to the Dry Tortugas.

In 1834, he graduated from medical college with a dissertation on Hippomane mancinella, subsequently working as a lecturer at the South Carolina Medical Society. In 1836 he returned as a naturalist to the Florida Keys, where in Key West, he joined a military group as a guide and surgeon. On 15 January 1838, he was mortally wounded in a skirmish with Seminoles near Jupiter Inlet.

After his death, 800 of his specimens eventually came into the possession of Jean Louis Cabanis, however these were completely destroyed during the bombing of Berlin in 1943. The genus Leitneria is named in his honor, as is the family Leitneriaceae, the latter taxa being circumscribed by George Bentham.

Publications associated with Leitner 
 "Edward Frederick Leitner (1812-1838), Physician-botanist", by George Edmund Gifford (1972).

References

External links 
 Edward Frederick Leitner (1812-1838), Physician-botanist Bulletin of the History of Medicine. VoL XLVI, No. 6, November–December, 1972

1812 births
1838 deaths
People from Schorndorf
University of Tübingen alumni
19th-century German botanists
German naturalists
German emigrants to the United States